Kirton railway station was a station in Kirton, Lincolnshire. It closed to passenger traffic on 11 September 1961 and freight traffic on 15 June 1964 .

References

Disused railway stations in Lincolnshire
Former Great Northern Railway stations
Railway stations in Great Britain opened in 1849
Railway stations in Great Britain closed in 1961
1849 establishments in England
Kirton, Lincolnshire